Santagostino is an Italian surname. Notable people with the surname include:

Duilio Santagostino (1914–1982), Italian footballer
Giuseppe Santagostino (1901–1955), Italian footballer and manager

Italian-language surnames